Nima Rumba is a singer, lyricist, musician, and actor from Nepal. Some of his popular songs are Block Hill, Huri Bataas, Samjhera Ti din Haru, Aau Aauna, and Preeti Basyo.

Personal life 
Nima was born in Subarnapur, Parsa of Nepal.  His family migrated to Parsa from Mudhe, Sindhupalchok before he was born. He is married to Sheli Thapa Magar.  The couple have two children.

Discography 
Albums 
Suna Suna (1994)
Memories (1996)
Huri Batas (2000)
Lolita (2002)
Faith (2004)
Pride (2006)
Rangau Ki Ma (2011)
Best of Nima Rumba (2002).

Films 

 Kagbeni (2008)                 
 VISA GIRL                  
 Ma                       
 Tshering (2019)

References

Living people
People from Parsa District
Nepalese musicians
Nepali-language singers
Nepalese pop singers
Nepalese male film actors
Tamang people
1974 births